Esther Kerr Rusthoi (February 21, 1909 – April 8, 1962) was an American author, poet, composer, singer, and evangelist, and was an associate pastor at the Angelus Temple of Los Angeles.  She is best known for her hymn, "It Will be Worth it All, When We See Jesus."  Her husband was Rev. Howard Rusthoi who also served as overseas chaplain in the U.S. armed forces. Together they were known as "revival broadcasters".  She was sister to evangelist Phil Kerr.

In addition to gospel songs, her other works include:

"Don't Give Up the Ship" (Glendale, California: The Church Press, 193?)
"Listen for the Whispers"
"Amazing Grace: Overwhelming Unmerited Divine Favor" (Glendale, California: The Church Press, 193?)
"Why Pray? A Challenging Call to Prayer!" (The Church Press, 194?)
"Listen for the Whispers!" (Glendale, California: The Church Press, circa 1952)

References

1909 births
1962 deaths
American Christian hymnwriters
American evangelists
Women evangelists
20th-century American musicians
20th-century American women musicians
American women hymnwriters
American women non-fiction writers